Thomas Roper may refer to:

 Thomas Roper (MP) (1534–1598/34-98), MP for New Shoreham, Sussex and Newport, Cornwall, England
 Thomas Roper, 1st Viscount Baltinglass (died 1638), Viscount Baltinglass
 Thomas Roper, 2nd Viscount Baltinglass (d. c. 1670)
 Thomas Roper (mayor) (1760–1829), mayor of Charleston, South Carolina
 Tom Roper (born 1945), Australian politician
 Tom Roper, character in Born to the Saddle